Jonathan Porter Berkey is a historian specializing in Islam and the Middle East. He is currently professor of history at Davidson College.
He received a bachelor's degree from Williams College, and his doctorate from Princeton University. In 2003 he was given the  Albert Hourani Book Award by the Middle Eastern Studies Association for his book The Formation of Islam: Religion and Society in the Near East, 600–1800.

Works
"The Mamluks as Muslims", The Mamluks in Egyptian politics and society, Editors Thomas Philipp, Ulrich Haarmann, Cambridge University Press, 1998, 
 The Transmission of Knowledge in Medieval Cairo: A Social History of Islamic Education, Princeton University Press, 1992, 
 Popular Preaching and Religious Authority in the Medieval Islamic Near East, University of Washington Press, 2001, 
 The Formation of Islam: Religion and Society in the Near East, 600–1800, Cambridge University Press, 2003,

References

Living people
Davidson College faculty
Williams College alumni
Princeton University alumni
Year of birth missing (living people)
21st-century American historians
21st-century American male writers
American male non-fiction writers